Sulphur is a city in and county seat of Murray County, Oklahoma, United States. The population was 4,929 at the 2010 census, a 3.4 percent gain over the figure of 4,794 in 2000. The area around Sulphur has been noted for its mineral springs, since well before the city was founded late in the 19th century. The city received its name from the presence of sulfur in the water.

History
This area was part of Pickens County, Chickasaw Nation in the Indian Territory during the late 19th century. The first known settler was Noah Lael, son-in-law of former Chickasaw Governor Cyrus Harris, who built a ranch south of Pavilion Springs in 1878. In 1882, Harris sold the ranch to Perry Froman, a part Chickasaw rancher. The Encyclopedia of Oklahoma History and Culture says the ranch house was the first residence in Sulphur.

About 1890, a group of fisherman built a clubhouse at the Sulphur site. Conventions and other gatherings began meeting in the vicinity during the early 1890s. The clubhouse owners enlarged the building and sold it for use as a hotel. Richard A. Sneed, a lawyer who visited the area about 1890 and soon after organized the Sulphur Springs Company. The company bought  of land from Froman Ranch and platted a townsite. A post office named Sulphur was established October 2, 1895.  The Sulphur Headlight, the first newspaper in town, began publication in 1899, and the first telephone exchange in town went into service in 1900.

The Frisco bought the Sulphur Springs Railway in 1907.

In 1902, the U.S. Government and the Chickasaw Nation agreed to preserve the area around the springs, and called it the Sulphur Springs Reservation, later renaming it as Platt National Park. People and buildings were required to move out of the reservation area. The people resettled nearby, creating two communities, West Sulphur and East Sulphur, divided by Rock Creek. Another such move occurred in 1904, when the U.S, government decided to add another  to the new park. The reservation officially opened to the public on  April 29, 1904.  Platt National Park was abolished by Congress and made part of the much larger Chickasaw National Recreation Area (CNRA) in 1976, which included Lake of the Arbuckles.

Sulphur defeated Davis, Oklahoma in an election in 1908 to determine the location of the county seat of the newly created Murray County.

A tornado touched down just northwest of the town on May, 9th, 2016. It was rated EF3 and did severe damage to homes and trees in the area.

Geography

Demographics

As of the census of 2000, there were 4,794 people, 1,877 households, and 1,244 families residing in the city. The population density was 703.1 people per square mile (271.4/km). There were 2,220 housing units at an average density of 325.6 per square mile (125.7/km). The racial makeup of the city was 79.45% White, 1.36% African American, 12.72% Native American, 0.38% Asian, 0.04% Pacific Islander, 1.52% from other races, and 4.53% from two or more races. Hispanic or Latino of any race were 4.80% of the population.

There were 1,877 households, out of which 100.0% had children under the age of 18 living with them, 49.3% were married couples living together, 12.8% had a female householder with no husband present, and 33.7% were non-families. 30.3% of all households were made up of individuals, and 15.5% had someone living alone who was 65 years of age or older. The average household size was 2.40 and the average family size was 2.97.

In the city, the population was spread out, with 23.9% under the age of 18, 9.2% from 18 to 24, 25.0% from 25 to 44, 21.3% from 45 to 64, and 20.5% who were 65 years of age or older. The median age was 39 years. For every 100 females, there were 96.1 males. For every 100 females age 18 and over, there were 90.8 males.

The median income for a household in the city was $27,236, and the median income for a family was $35,000. Males had a median income of $28,712 versus $19,438 for females. The per capita income for the city was $15,691. About 7.9% of families and 12.3% of the population were below the poverty line, including 17.5% of those under age 18 and 13.5% of those age 65 or over.

Economy
Although extraction industries (asphalt, lead, and zinc mines) have long been important, tourism is now the primary support to the local economy.

Attractions 

Chickasaw National Recreation Area (originally Platt National Park), a popular destination for many regional tourists, is located just south of the town of Sulphur.. Principal attractions in Sulphur besides the park are sulfurous water springs in town that were once thought to cure ailments and other medical conditions. The pungent odor and taste are quite popular with some people. Other attractions include the Arbuckle Mountain range, just to the southwest, complete with many hiking and recreational opportunities.

Sulphur is also the home to the newly finished Chickasaw Cultural Center, a museum which tells the story of the Chickasaw Nation.

Vendome Well remains the state's largest artesian spring. Its sulfur water fed a stream that converged with Travertine Creek and formed a small lake. People smeared the lake's mud on their bodies to cure ailments.

Government
Each of the city's five wards has a councilor, and the councilors collectively form the city's governing body.   In January 2014, Keith Mann was hired as City Manager of Sulphur; he was formerly the police chief of Ardmore, Oklahoma.  During 2020, Andy Freeman served as City Manager.

Education
The city of Sulphur is served by the Sulphur Public School District. The first public school opened in 1904. There is one elementary, intermediate, junior high and high school. During 2008, the enrollment for the district was at 1,383 students.

Athletics are a major piece of the school culture in Sulphur. Football is the most popular sport, and the Bulldogs have won State Championships in class 3A (2002) and 2A (2004). They were the 3A state runner-up in 2003. Powerlifting, basketball and baseball are also popular sports. The Bulldogs have won state championships in both baseball (1966 and 2004) and powerlifting (2005 and 2006). There has been a long and heated rivalry between Sulphur and the neighboring town of Davis, OK, located just 7 miles to the west, known locally as the Murray County Bedlam.

Oklahoma School for the Deaf is also located in Sulphur, Oklahoma. It opened in 1908 to provide the same educational opportunities for deaf and hard-of-hearing students as other schools provide for hearing students. These also include participation in sports: football, volleyball, track, etc.

Infrastructure

Roads and highways
Major highways are:
 Oklahoma State Highway 7
 Oklahoma State Highway 7 Spur
 Chickasaw Turnpike
 U.S. Route 177

Notable people
 Wayne Bennett, Blues guitarist, was born in Sulphur
 Roy Joseph Turner served as state governor from 1947 to 1951. Turner was born on November 6, 1894, in Lincoln County, Oklahoma Territory. Turner Turnpike, linking Tulsa with Oklahoma City was named for him
 Loyd Arms won the NCAA Wrestling National Championship in the heavyweight division. Arms was drafted by the Chicago Cardinals with the 129th overall selection of the 1943 NFL Draft

Notes

References

See also
 Chickasaw National Recreation Area

External links

 Sulphur Chamber of Commerce
Wray, Jacilee and Alexa Roberts. An Ethnohistory of the Relationship between the Community of Sulphur, Oklahoma and Chickasaw National Recreation Area. Chickasaw National Recreation Area. July 29, 2004.

Cities in Murray County, Oklahoma
Cities in Oklahoma
County seats in Oklahoma
Spa towns in the United States
Populated places established in 1882
1882 establishments in Indian Territory